The New Democratic Party ran a full slate of candidates in the 2004 federal election and elected nineteen members to become the fourth largest party in parliament.

Newfoundland and Labrador
Avalon: Michael Kehoe
Bonavista—Exploits: Samuel McLean
Humber—St. Barbe—Baie Verte: Holly Pike
Labrador: Shawn Crann
Random—Burin—St. George's: Desmond McGrath
St. John's North: Janine Piller
St. John's South: Peg Norman

Prince Edward Island
Cardigan: Dave MacKinnon
Charlottetown: Dody Crane
Egmont: Regena Kaye Russell
Malpeque: Ken Bingham

Nova Scotia
Cape Breton—Canso: Shirley Hartery
Central Nova: Alexis MacDonald
Dartmouth—Cole Harbour: Susan MacAlpine-Gillis
Halifax: Alexa McDonough
Halifax West: Bill Carr
Kings—Hants: Skip Hambling
North Nova: Margaret Sagar
Sackville—Eastern Shore: Peter Stoffer
South Shore—St. Margaret's: Gordon Earle
Sydney—Victoria: John Hugh Edwards
West Nova: Arthur Bull

New Brunswick
Acadie—Bathurst: Yvon Godin
Beauséjour: Omer Bourque
Fredericton: John Carty
Fundy: Pat Hanratty
Madawaska—Restigouche: Rodolphe Martin
Miramichi: Hilaire Rousselle
Moncton—Riverview—Dieppe: Hélène Lapointe
St. Croix—Belleisle: Patrick Webber
Saint John: Terry Albright
Tobique—Mactaquac: Jason Mapplebeck

Quebec

Ontario
Kathy Pounder (Brampton—Springdale)
Chris Moise (Brampton West)
Max Silverman (Eglinton—Lawrence)
Cesar Martello (Etobicoke North)
Ross Sutherland (Lanark—Frontenac—Lennox and Addington)
Gary Dale (Pickering—Scarborough East)
Nella Cotrupi (Richmond Hill)
Ted Mouradian (St. Catharines)
Colin Mackinnon (Simcoe—Grey)
Elaine MacDonald (Stormont—Dundas—South Glengarry)
Maret Sadem-Thompson (Whitby—Oshawa)
Rick Morelli (Willowdale)

Manitoba
Brandon—Souris: Mike Abbey
Charleswood—St. James: Peter Carney
Churchill: Bev Desjarlais
Dauphin—Swan River: Walter Kolisnyk
Elmwood—Transcona: Bill Blaikie
Kildonan—St. Paul: Lorene Mahoney
Portage—Lisgar: Daren Van den Bussche
Provencher: Sarah Zaharia
Saint Boniface: Mathieu Allard
Selkirk—Interlake: Duane Nicol
Winnipeg Centre: Pat Martin 
Winnipeg North: Judy Wasylycia-Leis
Winnipeg South: Catherine Green
Winnipeg South Centre: James Allum

Saskatchewan
Battlefords—Lloydminster: Shawn McKee
Blackstrap: Don Kossick
Churchill River: Earl Cook
Cypress Hills—Grasslands: Jeff Potts
Palliser: Dick Proctor
Prince Albert: Don Hovdebo
Regina—Lumsden—Lake Centre: Moe Kovatch
Regina—Qu'Appelle: Lorne Nystrom
Saskatoon—Humboldt: Nettie Wiebe
Saskatoon—Rosetown—Biggar: Dennis Gruending
Saskatoon—Wanuskewin: Priscilla Settee
Souris—Moose Mountain: Robert Stringer
Wascana: Erin Weir
Yorkton—Melville: Don Olson

Alberta
Daria Fox (Calgary Southwest)
Jeff Sloychuk (Red Deer South)

British Columbia
Bev Meslo (Vancouver South)

Territories
Nunavut: Bill Riddell
Western Arctic: Dennis Bevington
Yukon: Pam Boyde

References